The Boathouse in Laugharne, Wales, was where Dylan Thomas lived with his family during his last four years between 1949 and 1953. The house is set in a cliff overlooking the Tâf estuary and is where he wrote many of his major pieces. It has been suggested that he wrote Under Milk Wood here but more recent research suggests that fewer than 300 lines of the play were written in Laugharne.

History

There are no records of the house being in existence prior to 1834, when it was leased by the local authority to a family named Scourfield.  The road in which it stands was originally called Cliff Road, but has been renamed to Dylan's Walk.

Thomas first visited the village of Laugharne with a friend, the poet Glyn Jones, in 1934 and was attracted to it.  He moved there four years later with his wife Caitlin, and the Boat House was later bought for him by Margaret Taylor, first wife of the historian A. J. P. Taylor. Dylan and Caitlin brought up their three children, Aeronwy, Llewellyn and Colm. Thomas also rented, for his parents, "Pelican House", opposite Brown's Hotel in the town, and they lived there from 1949 until 1953. It was in this house that his father died and that the funeral was held. After Dylan's own death in 1953, Caitlin Thomas was keen to leave Laugharne because of its painful memories.

Thomas used a shed a little further along Cliff Road as his retreat, and did most of his writing there while he lived at the Boathouse. His poem, "Over Sir John's Hill", celebrated the view of the estuary it gave him, Sir John's Hill being located across the bay.

Thomas's boathouse inspired Roald Dahl to create his own writing hut at his Gipsy House, his home in Buckinghamshire.

Museum
The house is now owned by the Carmarthenshire County Council and serves as a museum, open to the public for most of the year.  It contains Thomas memorabilia and some of the original furniture, including Dylan's father's desk. The house receives about 15,000 visitors a year. The interior has been returned to its 1950s appearance, with a recording of Thomas's voice playing in the background. Close to the main house is a clifftop "writing shed" where Thomas spent much of his time. The interior of the shed is reconstructed with a writing table littered with discarded papers as though Thomas were in the process of working on a book.

The exhibits include a bust of Dylan Thomas, formerly owned by Richard Burton and Elizabeth Taylor, a letter from former US President Jimmy Carter, and a 1936 photograph of Thomas, notable for having been taken into space on board the Space Shuttle Columbia in 1998.

References

External links
 Official site

Buildings and structures in Carmarthenshire
Biographical museums in Wales
Boathouse
Historic house museums in Wales
Museums in Carmarthenshire
Literary museums in Wales
Laugharne